Riboud is a French surname. Notable people surnamed Riboud include:

 Marc Riboud (1923–2016), French photojournalist 
 Franck Riboud (born 1955), French businessman
 Barbara Chase-Riboud (born 1939), American artist and poet
 Jean Riboud (1919–1985), French businessman 
 Krishna Riboud (1926–2000), Indian art collector
 Philippe Riboud (born 9 April 1957), French fencer